Heikki Kirkinen (22 September 1927 in Kuusjärvi – 9 January 2018) was a Finnish historian who was professor of Finnish and European history at the University of Eastern Finland in Joensuu, Finland. He has been a visiting professor in the Finnish language, literature and culture at Sorbonne, 1966–1970.

Kirkinen has written many books about the Karelian history and the Karelian identity. One of his main interests was music; he has studied musicology and even composed music himself.

Publications
 Les origines de la conception moderne de l'hommemachine (1960)
 Le monde kalévaléen en France et en Finlande (1987, with Jean Perrot)
 Informatique et développement des régions marginales (1988, editor)
 Protection and development of our intangible heritage (1999, editor)
 Karjala idän kulttuuripiirissä, 1963
 Karjala taistelukenttänä, (Karjala idän ja lännen välissä, II), 1976, 
 Bysantin perinne ja Suomi, 
 Termiitti vai enkeli, ajatuksia kulttuurievoluutiosta, SKS (2002)
 Pohjois-Karjalan kalevaisen perinteen juuret, 1988,

References 
 Uppslagsverket Finland, 3 (2005)

1927 births
2018 deaths
University of Helsinki
Academic staff of the University of Paris
People from Outokumpu